Lewis Williams (born 24 December 1998, Leamington Spa) is an English boxer. He participated at the 2022 European Amateur Boxing Championships, winning the bronze medal in the heavyweight event. He previously participated at the 2021 AIBA World Boxing Championships in the heavyweight event, but was defeated in the quarter final by Madiyar Saydrakhimov.

Williams competed at the 2022 Commonwealth Games, winning the gold medal in the heavyweight division. He defeated Ato Plodzicki-Faoagali 5-0 in the final.

References

External links 

Living people
1998 births
People from Leamington Spa
English male boxers
Heavyweight boxers
Boxers at the 2022 Commonwealth Games
Commonwealth Games gold medallists for England
Commonwealth Games medallists in boxing
21st-century English people
Medallists at the 2022 Commonwealth Games